The Petronas FP1 is a  liquid cooled inline three-cylinder homologation special sport bike that was produced in 2003 by Petronas.

Originally developed jointly by Petronas and Sauber Petronas Engineering as the Petronas GP1 989cc prototype to compete in MotoGP, Petronas decided to race the motorcycle in the Superbike World Championship instead.

The final 75 units were assembled in Malaysia by the country's motorcycle manufacturer, Modenas by July 2003.

Out of the 150 units produced only 100 were made available to the public available in Panache Green, Exotic Black and Misty Grey. The other 50 units were kept to be used for racing.

Petronas joined forces with four-time Superbike World champion Carl Fogarty to form a racing team — Foggy Petronas Racing, with riders Troy Corser and James Haydon —  to participate in the Superbike World Championship.

From  the FIM changed the rules to allow 1000 cc machines (either twins, triples or four-cylinder) to race. The FP1 was developed under the previous regulations (that limited the engine displacement for 3-cylinder to 900cc), as a result the motorcycle was at a disadvantage from the rest of the field.

With Japanese motorcycles returning in  the FP1 fell behind and by  it was struggling to finish in the points. Petronas terminated the superbike project at the end of 2006.

In 2010, Motor Cycle News discovered 60 brand new FP1's stored in Basildon, Essex. Manufactured for Petronas by MSX International for homologation purposes, they were part of the original batch of 75, but which were never shipped to Malaysia. The bikes are presently held in the former MSX premises by new company owner Arrk R&D, who are subject to a confidentiality agreement to Petronas.

References

Petronas
Motorcycles by brand
Motorcycles of Malaysia